"What Were You Thinkin'" is a song recorded by American country music group Little Texas.  It was released in October 1992 as the fourth single from the album First Time for Everything.  The song reached #17 on the Billboard Hot Country Singles & Tracks chart.  The song was written by Porter Howell, Dwayne O'Brien, Brady Seals and Christy DiNapoli.

Chart performance

References

1993 singles
Little Texas (band) songs
Songs written by Brady Seals
Songs written by Dwayne O'Brien
Songs written by Porter Howell
Song recordings produced by James Stroud
Warner Records singles
1991 songs